West Central High School is a public high school located near Francesville, Indiana, U.S.

See also
 List of high schools in Indiana

References

External links
 Official Website

Public high schools in Indiana
Schools in Pulaski County, Indiana